Blairstown was one of the three original Delaware, Lackawanna and Western Railroad stations on the Lackawanna Cut-Off rail line in northwestern New Jersey.  Built by contractor Hyde, McFarlan & Burke, the station opened in 1911.  Most passenger trains, such as the Lackawanna Limited and, later, the Phoebe Snow, plus the Twilight/Pocono Express and the Westerner/New Yorker stopped at Blairstown, which also sold commuter tickets. It was the only station on the Cut-Off to be open during the Erie Lackawanna years, and remained so until passenger service ended on January 6, 1970 with the discontinuing of the Lake Cities. After 1970, the building housed a radio station, WHCY-FM, until the 1990s. The station building is currently privately owned.

Blairstown is slated to become a station stop once again if a proposal by New Jersey Transit to restore rail service to Scranton, Pennsylvania, comes to fruition, with the station proposed to be situated between the track and Hope Road. In spring 2021, Amtrak announced plans for potential New York–Scranton route. Blairstown was cited as the intermediate station between Dover and East Stroudsburg on the route.

Lackawanna Cut-Off Restoration Project reconnection to Blairstown appeared a step closer on April 13, 2022, when the NJ Transit board announced the approval of an approximated $32.5 million contract for completion of repairs to the Roseville Tunnel and construction of the new Andover station (14 miles east of Blairstown). It is anticipated that work will be completed in the latter part of 2026. Additional work remains for reinstalling track from Andover to Blairstown.

References

External links
 Lackawanna Cut-Off map

Lackawanna Cut-Off
Proposed railway stations in the United States
Proposed NJ Transit rail stations
Former Delaware, Lackawanna and Western Railroad stations
Railway stations in the United States opened in 1911
Railway stations closed in 1970
Proposed public transportation in New Jersey
1911 establishments in New Jersey
Blairstown, New Jersey